Archispirostreptus gigas, known as the giant African millipede or shongololo, is the largest extant species of millipede, growing up to  in length,  in circumference. It has approximately 256 legs, although the number of legs changes with each molting so it can vary according to each individual.

It is a widespread species in lowland parts of East Africa, from Mozambique to Kenya, but rarely reaches altitudes above . It lives mostly in forests, but can also be found in areas of coastal habitat that contain at least a few trees. It is native to Southern Arabia, especially Dhofar.

In general, giant millipedes have a life expectancy of about 7–10 years. Giant millipedes have two main modes of defence if they feel threatened: curling into a tight spiral exposing only the hard exoskeleton, and secretion of an irritating liquid from pores on their body. This liquid can be harmful if introduced into the eyes or mouth. Because of this defense, A. gigas is one of the few invertebrates that driver ants are incapable of taking as prey.

Small mites are often observed crawling on their exoskeleton and among their legs. The millipedes have a symbiotic relationship with these mites, in which the mites help clean the millipede's exoskeleton in exchange for food and the protection of their host.

A docile species, A. gigas is commonly seen in the pet trade; however, imports of A. gigas, as well as a number of other millipedes, into the USA are banned due to agricultural damage caused by the mites they carry.

References

External links

 Giant African Millipede (Archispirostreptus gigas), Point Defiance Zoo & Aquarium
 Giant millipedes as pets, About.com

Spirostreptida
Millipedes of Africa
Animals described in 1855
Taxa named by Wilhelm Peters